Thomas Mudge is the name of:

 Thomas H. Mudge (1815–1862), American Methodist Episcopal clergyman
 Thomas Mudge (horologist) (1715–1794), British watchmaker and the inventor of the lever escapement